Ray Gill (8 December 1924, Manchester – 17 September 2001, Rochdale) holds the Football League appearance record for Chester.

The full-back played in 406 league games for Chester from 1951 to 1962, putting him seven ahead of Ron Hughes (whose Chester career ran almost parallel to Gill's) and 10 ahead of Trevor Storton.

Gill had earlier played for hometown club Manchester City, where he made eight appearances. However, he was to enjoy a regular place at Chester for most of his time with the club. This was despite the fact he was part-time in his later years at the club as he worked as a salesman.

Gill was awarded testimonial matches by Chester in 1956 and 1962 against representative teams. He later played for Hyde United, Altrincham and Winsford United.

External links
 Chester City Obituary

References

Chester City F.C. players
Manchester City F.C. players
Altrincham F.C. players
Hyde United F.C. players
Winsford United F.C. players
1924 births
2001 deaths
English footballers
Footballers from Manchester
English Football League players
Association football fullbacks